Sean S. Munson (born April 27) is an American basketball player.

College career
Munson signed with Lafayette College and played there for one year. He transferred to Wagner College. Under coach Dereck Whittenburg, he was part of a team that won the NEC Regular Season and Tournament Championship. They advanced to the NCAA Tournament and played Pittsburgh.

In his three-year career at Wagner, he scored 801 points and grabbed 639 rebounds and was a starter during his Junior and Senior year. During his senior year (under Coach Mike Deane), he led his team in rebounding and scoring, and was ranked 30th in the nation in rebounding. Munson led his team to the NEC Championship game in 2005.

Education
Munson graduated from Wagner with a Double Major Degree in Mathematics and Computer Science with a Minor in Physics.

Honors
Munson was named to the NIT Tournament team. He traveled to the Bahamas to play the Bahamian National Team. He traveled to China to play the Chinese National Team. He was recognized as an Academic All-American. He also received the New York Metropolitan Area Basketball Student Athlete Award, which was presented at Madison Square Garden. The Northeast Conference awarded him the NEC Basketball Scholar Athlete Award. His alma mater, Wagner College, named him their Student Athlete of the Year.

Professional career

Munson has played professionally for four years. He played in Luxembourg for Black Star Mersch. He played in Israel for Afula. He played for Bnei Hasharon in Herzliya and Ra'anana.

References

External links
 Profile on EuroBasket

1982 births
Living people
American men's basketball players
Black Star Mersch players
Lafayette Leopards men's basketball players
Power forwards (basketball)
Wagner Seahawks men's basketball players